Didymocantha is a genus of longhorn beetles.

Species 
The following species are accepted in the genus Didymocantha:

 Didymocantha brevicollis Pascoe, 1866
 Didymocantha clavipes Broun, 1883
 Didymocantha flavopicta McKeown, 1949
 Didymocantha gracilis McKeown, 1942
 Didymocantha laticornis (Fauvel, 1906)
 Didymocantha nigra Blackburn, 1890
 Didymocantha novica Blackburn, 1892
 Didymocantha obliqua Newman, 1840
 Didymocantha pallida Broun, 1893
 Didymocantha picta Bates, 1874
 Didymocantha quadriguttata Sharp, 1886
 Didymocantha sublineata (White, 1846)

References 

Callidiopini
Beetles described in 1840
Cerambycidae genera